Smilax china is a climbing plant species in the genus Smilax. It is native to China, Korea, Taiwan, Japan (including Ryukyu and Bonin Islands), Philippines, Vietnam, Thailand, Myanmar, and India. It also known as china root, china-root, or chinaroot, as is the related Smilax glabra.

Description

Kaempferol 7-O-glucoside, a flavonol glucoside, can be found in S. china.

Habitat
In China, S. china occurs in forests, thickets, hillsides, grassy slopes, and shaded places along valleys or streams.

References

External links 
 

Smilacaceae
Plants described in 1753
Taxa named by Carl Linnaeus
Flora of Myanmar
Flora of China
Flora of Assam (region)
Flora of Japan
Flora of Korea
Flora of Taiwan
Flora of Thailand
Flora of Vietnam